Trams in Dubrovnik was the public transit system that operated in the Croatian city of Dubrovnik from 1910 until 1970.

History

The first tram commenced operations on 22 December 1910 between the city gates at (Pile) and nearby port of Gruž, and expanded throughout its life with an extension of the original line to the Dubrovnik railway station, and a second line to Lapad.

The last full day of tram service was Friday 20 March 1970. The next morning on the 21st free rides were given to all as a final farewell to the old tramcars, several of which were the originals from 1910. Large crowds, mostly of locals, took advantage of their last chance to ride the trams which ran a special service between Lapad and the railway station at Gruz. At noon a straggled procession was formed of the system's 9 remaining vehicles which filed one by one into the depot which shut its gates without ceremony at 12:30. That was the end of the Dubrovnik trams.

Road transport services in the city are now exclusively operated by buses. The tramways carried around 100 million passengers during its six decades of existence.

References

External links
 Dubrovnik tram

Dubrovnik
History of Dubrovnik
Transport in Dubrovnik
Dubrovnik